William Dexter Curtis (1857–1935) was Mayor of Madison, Wisconsin. He held the office from 1904 to 1905.

His former home, now known as the Curtis-Kittleson House, is listed on the National Register of Historic Places. The house was also lived in by Madison Mayor Isaac Milo Kittleson.

References

Mayors of Madison, Wisconsin
1857 births
1935 deaths